Nitrolic acids are organic compounds with the functional group RC(NO2)=NOH.  They are prepared by the reaction of nitroalkanes with base and nitrite sources:
RCH2NO2  +  HNO2  →   RC(NO2)=NOH  +  H2O  
The conversion was first demonstrated by Victor Meyer using nitroethane.  The reaction proceeds via the intermediacy of the nitronate anion.

Occurrence
Most nitrolic acids are laboratory curiosities.  One exception is the compound HO2C(CH2)4C(NO2)=NOH, which is produced by the oxidation of cyclohexanone with nitric acid. This species decomposes to adipic acid and nitrous oxide:
HO2C(CH2)4C(NO2)=NOH  →  HO2C(CH2)4CO2H  +  N2O

This conversion is thought to be the largest anthropogenic route to N2O, which, on a molecule-to-molecule basis, has 298 times the atmospheric heat-trapping ability of carbon dioxide. Adipic acid is a precursor to many nylon polymers. In the end, nitrous oxide is produced in about one to one mole ratio to the adipic acid.

References 

Functional groups
Organonitrogen compounds